The Wreck Of The Zanzibar is a children's novel by Michael Morpurgo. It was first published Great Britain by William Heinemann Publishers in 1995. The book won the Whitbread Children's Book Award in 1995.

Plot summary
The story unfolds in journal entries and watercolor illustrations made by 14-year-old Laura Perryman in 1907 and 1908. She tells of her life on Bryher, one of Britain's Scilly Isles, where her family's survival depends on the mercy of the elements and the sea. One winter is particularly harsh, with the family's cows sickening and dying, the weather destroying houses and boats, the food stores dwindling and Laura's twin brother, Billy, running away to join a ship's crew. As bleak as Laura's days are, she is gentle enough to protect a sea turtle which might otherwise serve as food, and hopeful enough to dream of rowing in the island gig despite repeated declarations that a girl will never be allowed to handle one of the oars. Laura gets her chance in a dramatic storm and shipwreck, and helps save the island.

References

1995 British novels
Children's historical novels
British children's novels
Novels by Michael Morpurgo
Books about turtles
Novels set in Cornwall
Fiction set in 1907
Bryher
Fiction set in 1908
Novels set on islands
1995 children's books
Heinemann (publisher) books